Callistosiren is an extinct genus of mammal which existed in what is now Puerto Rico during the late Oligocene (Chattian).

References

Oligocene sirenians
Fossil taxa described in 2015
Prehistoric placental genera